Bruno Semenzato (born 11 July 1992) is a Brazilian tennis player.

Semenzato has a career high ATP singles ranking of 714 achieved on 14 November 2011. He also has a career high ATP doubles ranking of 612 achieved on 3 October 2011.

Semenzato made his ATP main draw debut at the 2011 Farmers Classic in the doubles draw partnering Márcio Torres. Semenzato played college tennis at Duke University.

References

External links

1992 births
Living people
Brazilian male tennis players
Tennis players from São Paulo
Duke Blue Devils men's tennis players
21st-century Brazilian people
20th-century Brazilian people